Antal Festetics, exactly  (born June 12, 1937, Budapest, Hungary), is a Hungarian-Austrian biologist, zoologist and behavioural researcher. A student of Konrad Lorenz, in 1973 he became a university professor and director of the Institute for Hunting Biology at the University of Göttingen. In 1981 he became an honorary professor at the University of Vienna. In 1980 he became president of the Konrad Lorenz Institute for Evolution and Cognition Research. He was awarded for the establishment of national parks in Austria and Hungary, as well as the Austrian State Prize for Environmental Protection in 1988.

Decorations and awards

References 

 The Culture Information System of the Austrian Ministry of Education, Science and Culture

1937 births
Living people
Hungarian biologists
Film people from Budapest
Hungarian zoologists
Austrian biologists
Austrian zoologists
Austrian people of Hungarian descent
Officers Crosses of the Order of Merit of the Federal Republic of Germany
Recipients of the Austrian State Prize
Recipients of the Romy (TV award)
Recipients of the Austrian Cross of Honour for Science and Art, 1st class
Members of the European Academy of Sciences and Arts
Antal